The Shan Herald Agency for News is a private, nonprofit organization which attempts to fill the information void and shed light on the current situation in Shan State in Burma, where the media is closely controlled and censored.

Originally established in Shan State in 1991, the Shan Herald Agency for News was moved to Chiang Mai, Thailand in 1996 where it was better able to maintain its independence from armed political factions operating in Shan State.

Aims and Activities

Aims
 To provide accurate and reliable information to the Burmese, Shan, Thai and the international community about political, social and economic developments in Shan State and Burma, and about the efforts of pro-democracy, student, ethnic and labor organizations to promote peace and democracy in Burma.
 To promote increased understanding among Shan of human rights, democracy, federalism, and ethnic rights.
 To educate the Shan people about the cultural, historical and linguistic heritage of Shan State.

Activities
The agency regularly receives news and photographs from within Shan State thanks to a network of supporters resident there. S.H.A.N. also dispatches field reporters to cover specific issues when conditions permit, as well as interviewing people from Shan State when they arrive at the Thai-Burma and China-Burma borders.  In addition, given the proximity to Shan State, S.H.A.N. is able to monitor the military junta's radio broadcasts.

Through the publication of its monthly newspaper Independence, its website and email information service, S.H.A.N. provides one of the few sources of news about events occurring in Shan State. Thanks to its publication in Shan, Burmese, English and Thai, it is not only a valuable resource for the Shan community in Burma, but also for the Shan exile community in Thailand and for Burma-watchers in the international community.

S.H.A.N. prints 3,000 copies of its newspaper each month, distributing them through a network of activists along the Thai-Burma and China-Burma borders, as well as being dispatched directly to Shan State and distributed at Shan temples in Thailand. It is also sent out to international NGOs and other interested parties abroad.

See also
Shan Women's Action Network
Human rights in Burma

References 
 
 https://shannews.org
 https://burmese.shannews.org
 https://english.shannews.org

External links
 Arakan Post
 Kaowao News Group

News agencies based in Thailand
Shan State